Gamma-aminobutyric acid receptor subunit gamma-1 is a protein that in humans is encoded by the GABRG1 gene. The protein encoded by this gene is a subunit of the GABAA receptor.

Variants of this gene may be associated with alcohol dependence.

References

Further reading

External links 
 

Ion channels